In the People's Republic of China, access by the general public to firearms is subject to some of the strictest control measures in the world. With the exception of individuals with hunting permits and some ethnic minorities, civilian firearm ownership is restricted to non-individual entities.

Law enforcement, military, paramilitary, and security personnel are allowed to use firearms. Police are to use issued pistols only to stop serious or dangerous crimes.

Airsoft guns are practically prohibited in China, as muzzle energy limits classify them as real firearms.

History

Gunpowder was invented in China more than a thousand years ago, with the first definitive written record of chemical formulae found in the mid-11th century Song dynasty military compendium Wujing Zongyao, and the very earliest possible reference dating to the Eastern Han dynasty.  During the Ming and Qing dynasties, matchlock muskets were used in China, and the Chinese used the term "bird-gun" to refer to muskets.

Mao Zedong remarked "Political power grows out of the barrel of a gun" in 1927 and 1938, a sentiment that was maintained after winning the civil war.  The country's strict centralized stance on gun control was officially instated in the country in 1966, and extended in 1996 when the government banned the buying, selling and transporting of firearms without official permission.  According to the Chinese police, up until 2006, an underground gun-trading triangle in Southwest China fed the Chinese gun market, with guns being manufactured in Songtao and trafficked into Xiushan and Huayuan before reaching a national distribution scale.

According to official figures, from June to September 2006 (six-month crackdown) the Chinese authorities confiscated 178,000 illegal guns, 3,900 tons of explosives, 7.77 million detonators and 4.75 million bullets. In 2007, a study released by the Geneva-based Graduate Institute of International and Development Studies estimated that around 40 million guns were owned by Chinese civilians, a gross over-estimation according to Chinese analysts. Throughout the 2000s, The Wall Street Journal noted a rise of gun popularity in China.

Specifications
In China, firearms can be used by law enforcement, the military and paramilitary, or security personnel protecting property of state importance (including the arms industry, financial institutions, storage of resources, and scientific research institutions).

Civilian ownership of firearms is largely restricted to non-individual entities such as sporting organizations, hunting reserves, and wildlife protection, management and research organizations.  The chief exception to the general ban for individual gun ownership is for the purpose of hunting. Individuals who hold hunting permits can apply to purchase and hold firearms for the purpose of hunting. Illegal possession or sale of firearms may result in a minimum punishment of 3 years in prison, and the penalty for a gun crime is death penalty.

Airsoft guns are also practically prohibited due to the Ministry of Public Security dictating very restrictive new criteria that rendered most such toy guns being defined as real firearms, and violation may lead to a criminal conviction for illegal possession of firearms. Official media has discussed potential dangers of imitation guns.

Special regions

Miao people
The possession of traditional smoothbore blackpowder muskets is allowed to some Miao hill people, the so-called Miao gun tribes, as an essential element of traditional dress and culture; however, possession of gunpowder is regulated.

The Biasha (Basha) Miao people living in Bingmei, Guizhou, claim they can legally possess guns, since they use them for their annual traditional performance.

Hong Kong and Macau
Firearm ownership in the special administrative regions of Hong Kong and Macau is tightly controlled and possession is mainly in the hands of law enforcement, military, or private security firms (providing protection for jewelers and banks).  Still, possessing, manufacturing, importing, or exporting airsoft guns with a muzzle energy not above  is legal to citizens in China's SARs.

Firearms control was inherited during British and Portuguese rule and more or less retained today.  Under the Section 13 of Cap 238 Firearms and Ammunition Ordinance of the Hong Kong law, unrestricted firearms and ammunition requires a license. Those found in possession without a license could be fined HKD$100,000 and imprisonment for up to 14 years.

See also
 Estimated number of civilian guns per capita by country
 Gun control
 List of countries by firearm-related death rate
 Overview of gun laws by nation

References

Chinese law
Gun laws in China
Crime in China
Crime in Hong Kong
Crime in Macau
Gun politics in China